The Panguipulli Lake is one of the "Seven Lakes" in Panguipulli municipality, southern Chile. The lake is of glacial origin and it is enclosed by mountain ranges of the Andes, on all sides except the west, where the town of Panguipulli lies in the Chilean Central Valley. The lake is drained by the Enco River that flows south to Riñihue Lake.

External links
    Satellite image of Panguipulle Lake

Lakes of Los Ríos Region
Lakes of Chile
Glacial lakes of Chile
Mapuche language